Donna Jones may refer to:

People
Donna M. Jones, Idaho state controller
Murder of Donna Jones, Canadian murder victim
Donna Jones (singer), British performing artist with The New Seekers, known as Pussyfoot in the 1970s
Donna Jones (British politician), British politician; Police and Crime Commissioner for Hampshire and the Isle of Wight (2021-)

Objects
22855 Donnajones, an asteroid named for Arizona teacher Donna Jones

Jones, Donna